Fowl Records was co-founded in 1994 by Jimi Haha from Jimmie's Chicken Shack, Richard James Burgess, the band's manager (Burgess Worldco Inc.) and Chris Keith, the band's agent (Creative Booking International, Inc.) as a means to release Jimmie's Chicken Shack's first two independent CDs. Almost immediately it became the top indie label in the Mid-Atlantic region specializing in alternative rock, punk, and jam bands. From 1998 to the closure of the label in 2002 Chris Smoker was the label manager.

Releases
Fowl released the first three J.C.S. recordings. the cassettes Chicken Scratch in 1993 Spit Burger Lottery in 1994 which were later put on one 
cd called 2 For 1 Special. 1995 a live cd called Giving Something Back was released. In 1996 Fowl incorporated and released "An Udderly Fowl Release," a compilation featuring regional powerhouses like the Kelly Bell Band, All Mighty Senators, Mary Prankster, and the unreleased Jimmie's Chicken Shack song, "Bongjam." There was a later compilation entitled "A Family Fowlbum."

Fowl was not focused on a particular genre of music, but regarded by its founders as a development tool for local and regional bands in the Mid-Atlantic Music Scene to gain exposure through Fowl's substantial local, regional and national distribution network as well as their online store which was one of the first independent online music and music merchandise stores.  The Fowl Records business model was built around grass roots and lifestyle promotion, leveraging mail and (early) email lists gleaned from the substantial fanbases the bands developed by playing as many shows as possible. Fowl sold hundreds of thousands and possibly millions of CDs through its own distribution network.

At its peak Fowl was able to leverage its success and respect in the area by launching the local band stage, which was initially called "The Fowl Stage," at the highly regarded HFStival. Several of the label's artists won Wammies from the Washington Area Music Association. In the days before the massive consolidation of radio properties the programming staff at WHFS were highly supportive of Fowl Records, Jimmie's Chicken Shack and the label's other artists.

Fowl Bands 
All Mighty Senators
Baltic Avenue
Cactus Patch
.click.
Colouring Lesson
Cubic Feet
Doug Segree
Fidel
Imbue
Jepetto
Jimmie's Chicken Shack
Julius Bloom
Kelly Bell Band
Laughing Colors
Live Alien Broadcast
Margret Heater
Mary Prankster
Rebel Amish Radio
Rezin
Spooky Daly Pride
Underfoot
Venus Sparkplug
The Martians
Jarflys

See also
List of record labels

References

American record labels
Record labels established in 1994
Record labels disestablished in 2002
Vanity record labels
Alternative rock record labels